Elio Enai Rojas (born September 25, 1982) is a Dominican Republican professional boxer.

Amateur Highlights
1999- Gold Medal in the Battle of Carabobo and Cheo Aponte Tournament.

Elio Rojas solidified his status as a World Class Boxer in 2000 by winning four Gold Medals in international tournaments.

2001 to 2002: 
 Gold Medalist Champion of the Independence Cup in Santo Domingo
 Gold Medalist PanAmerican Tournament at 118
 Champion of Central America Champion at 122
 Com of the Olympic festival in Mexico
 Champion of the International Cup Romana
 World Championships Bronze Medalist in Belfast in Northern Ireland

Professional career
Rojas turned professional in 2004 and scored 19 straight victories to start his career.

On September 13, 2008, Rojas defeated Hector Velasquez in a WBC challenger elimination bout.

On July 14, 2009, Rojas traveled to Japan to fight Takahiro Aho, the WBC featherweight champion. Rojas won the WBC Featherweight Title with a unanimous decision.

Rojas signed to unify the featherweight title in 2010 only to injure his hand prior to the fight.

Rojas faced Mexican boxer Jhonny Gonzales, to regain the WBC Featherweight title but lost via unanimous decision.

Professional boxing record

See also
List of world featherweight boxing champions

References

External links

 

1982 births
Living people
Dominican Republic male boxers
People from San Francisco de Macorís
Central American and Caribbean Games medalists in boxing
Central American and Caribbean Games gold medalists for the Dominican Republic
Competitors at the 2002 Central American and Caribbean Games
AIBA World Boxing Championships medalists
World featherweight boxing champions
World Boxing Council champions